FK Budućnost Dobanovci is a football club based in Dobanovci, Belgrade, Serbia. They compete in the Serbian League Belgrade, the third tier of the national league system.

History
Founded in 1920, the club won the Serbian League Belgrade in the 2015–16 season and took promotion to the Serbian First League. They finished 10th in their first appearance in the second tier of Serbian football. The club subsequently made its Serbian Cup debut in the 2017–18 campaign, upsetting Voždovac in the first round on penalties. They eventually exited the competition in the next round following a 6–1 loss to Vojvodina. After spending six seasons in the Serbian First League, the club suffered relegation to the Serbian League Belgrade in 2022.

Honours
Serbian League Belgrade (Tier 3)
 2015–16
Belgrade Zone League (Tier 4)
 2011–12

Seasons

Notable players
This is a list of players who have played at full international level.
  Omega Roberts
For a list of all FK Budućnost Dobanovci players with a Wikipedia article, see :Category:FK Budućnost Dobanovci players.

Managerial history

References

External links
 
 Club page at Srbijasport

1920 establishments in Serbia
Association football clubs established in 1920
Football clubs in Belgrade
Football clubs in Serbia
Surčin